Carmelo Barbieri (born 24 February 1956) was an Italian-born Canadian soccer player who earned one cap for the national team in 1974.

Career  
Barbieri originally played with Toronto Westwood, and in 1974 he played in the National Soccer League with Toronto Italia. In 1975, he played in the Serie C with Casertana. In the summer of 1975 he returned to play with Toronto Italia where he assisted in securing the First Division title. The following season he played in the Serie D with Lavello, and later in the Serie C2 with Monopoli. In 1981, he played in the Campionato Interregionale with Ariano Irpino.

International career
Barbieri made his debut for Canada in an April 1974 friendly match against Bermuda.

References

External links

1956 births
Living people
Sportspeople from Calabria
Italian emigrants to Canada
Canadian people of Calabrian descent
Association football forwards
Canada men's international soccer players
Canadian soccer players
Toronto Italia players
Casertana F.C. players
S.S. Monopoli 1966 players
Canadian National Soccer League players
Serie C players
Serie D players